Sceloporus huichol is a species of lizard in the family Phrynosomatidae. It is endemic to Mexico, and can specifically be found in the mountainous regions of Jalisco and Nayarit. Sceloporus huichol belongs to the species group torquatus. Phylogenetically, Sceloporus huichol is closely related to Sceloporus melanogaster.

References

Sceloporus
Endemic reptiles of Mexico
Reptiles described in 2022